Cyclohexene is a hydrocarbon with the formula C6H10. This cycloalkene is a colorless liquid with a sharp smell.  It is an intermediate in various industrial processes. Cyclohexene is not very stable upon long term storage with exposure to light and air because it forms peroxides.

Production and uses
Cyclohexene is produced by the partial hydrogenation of benzene, a process developed by the Asahi Chemical company.  In the laboratory, it can be prepared by dehydration of cyclohexanol.

Reactions and uses
Benzene is converted to cyclohexylbenzene by acid-catalyzed alkylation with cyclohexene. Cyclohexylbenzene is a precursor to both phenol and cyclohexanone.

Hydration of cyclohexene gives cyclohexanol, which can be dehydrogenated to give cyclohexanone, a precursor to caprolactam.

The oxidative cleavage of cyclohexene gives adipic acid. Hydrogen peroxide is used as the oxidant in the presence of a tungsten catalyst. Bromination gives 1,2-dibromocyclohexane.

Structure 
Cyclohexene is most stable in a half-chair conformation, unlike the preference for a chair form of cyclohexane. One basis for the cyclohexane conformational preference for a chair is that it allows each bond of the ring to adopt a staggered conformation. For cyclohexene, however, the alkene is planar, equivalent to an eclipsed conformation at that bond.

See also 
 Diels-Alder reaction
 Cyclohexa-1,3-diene
 Cyclohexa-1,4-diene

External links 
 
 
 Material Safety Data Sheet for cyclohexene
 Safety MSDS data
  Reaction of Cyclohexene with Bromine and Potassium Permanganate
 Cyclohexene synthesis
 Data sheet at inchem.org

References 

Cycloalkenes
Hydrocarbon solvents
Foul-smelling chemicals